This is a season-by-season list of records compiled by Clarkson in men's ice hockey.

Clarkson University has made twenty-two appearances in the NCAA Tournament, making the Frozen Four seven times and the championship game three times.

Clarkson completed an undefeated season in 1956, however, because eight members of the team were 4-year seniors and would have been ineligible to play in the tournament Clarkson declined the invitation.

Season-by-season results

Note: GP = Games played, W = Wins, L = Losses, T = Ties

* Winning percentage is used when conference schedules are unbalanced.† Clarkson played jointly in ECAC Hockey and the Tri-State League/ICAC from 1961 to 1972.‡ Mark Morris was fired in November of 2002.

Footnotes

References

 
Lists of college men's ice hockey seasons in the United States
Clarkson Golden Knights ice hockey seasons